Mycobacterium confluentis is a non-pathogenic bacterium of the oral cavity.

Description
Gram-positive, nonmotile, acid-fast coccobacillus (0.5-0.8 µm x 0.7-1.7 µm), does not form spores, capsules or aerial hyphae.

Physiology
Rapid growth within 2 to 4 days on Löwenstein-Jensen media at 22 °C, 31 °C, 37 °C and 41 °C (optimum growth between 31 °C and 37 °C).
In vitro susceptibility to isoniazid, ethambutol and streptomycin.

Differential characteristics
Differentiation from other thermotolerant mycobacteria by its inability to grow at temperatures of more than 41 °C.
Separation from other rapidly growing mycobacteria by its susceptibility to antituberculotic drugs.
Differentiated from the phenotypic closely related M. thermoresistibile by its inability to grow at 52 °C.

Pathogenesis
Not associated with disease.  Biosafety level 1.

Type strain
First isolated from sputum, Koblenz, Germany.
strain 1389/90 = ATCC 49920 = CIP 105510 = DSM 44017 = JCM 13671.

References

Kirschner et al. 1992. Mycobacterium confluentis sp. nov. Int. J. Syst. Bacteriol., 42, 257–262.

External links
Type strain of Mycobacterium confluentis at BacDive -  the Bacterial Diversity Metadatabase

Acid-fast bacilli
confluentis
Bacteria described in 1992